Roy Albert Wisbey (13 June 1929 – 21 October 2020) was a British medievalist, Professor of German at King's College, London, and one of the leading figures in British German studies. He was also a pioneer in the field of digital humanities, founding the Literary and Linguistic Computing Centre in Cambridge in 1964 and later promoting the establishment of the Centre for Computing in the Humanities at King's. Over a period of 40 years he led the transformation of the Modern Humanities Research Association (MHRA) into a major scholarly publisher. He was recognised by both the German and Austrian governments for his contribution to German Studies.

Education
Roy Wisbey was born on 13 June 1929 in Bishop's Stortford, Hertfordshire, to working-class parents Albert and Mary Wisbey. He was educated at Bishop's Stortford College and did his National Service as a Chief Instructor in the Royal Army Educational Corps. He won an Open Scholarship to Queens' College, Cambridge, matriculating in October 1949. He achieved a first class degree in the Modern and Medieval Languages Tripos and graduated in 1952. He studied in Germany 1952–1955, earning a doctorate under Julius Schwietering at the Johann Wolfgang Goethe-Universität, Frankfurt-am-Main. His 1956 thesis Das Alexanderbild Rudolfs von Ems was published in 1966.

Academic career
Roy Wisbey's first academic post was as a Research fellow at Bedford College, London, where he spent the year 1955–1956, after which he was appointed to a lectureship in German at the University of Durham, where he taught German literature from the sixteenth century to the modern day.

In 1958 he moved to Cambridge to take up a lectureship in Medieval German Literature at the Faculty of Modern and Medieval Languages, and he also became a Fellow of Downing College. It was at this point that he became interested in the possibilities offered by computer concordances of medieval texts, which led to him establishing the university's Literary and Linguistic Computing Centre in 1964.

From 1971 to his retirement in 1994 he was Professor of German and Head of German at King's College London.

Selected publications

Middle High German literature

 (The Presidential Address of the Modern Humanities Research Association)

Humanities computing

Festschrift

Notes

Sources

External links
Roy Wisbey, and Literary and Linguistic Computing, 1965 style – Article from Cambridge Evening News. 24 September 1965

1929 births
2020 deaths
People from Bishop's Stortford
People educated at Bishop's Stortford College
Alumni of Queens' College, Cambridge
Goethe University Frankfurt alumni
Academics of King's College London
Fellows of King's College London
British medievalists
Germanists
People in digital humanities
Recipients of the Order of Merit of the Federal Republic of Germany
Academics of Durham University